Discovery Island is an  island in Bay Lake, Florida. It is located on the property of Walt Disney World in the city of Bay Lake. Between 1974 and 1999, it was an attraction open to guests, who could observe its many species of animals and birds. Disney originally named it Treasure Island, and later renamed it Discovery Island. It currently sits abandoned, but can be seen by any watercraft in Bay Lake. Discovery Island is now the name of one of the lands in Disney's Animal Kingdom.

History

Origins
From 1900 to 1937, the island was known as Raz Island, named after the family that lived there. In the late 1930s, it was purchased for $800 by a man named Delmar "Radio Nick" Nicholson, who renamed it "Idle Bay Isle" and lived there for 20 years with his wife and pet crane. It was later sold, renamed "Riles Island," and used as a hunting retreat. Disney bought it in 1965 as part of its strategic property acquisitions before building the Walt Disney World Resort.

Delmar lived on the island and grew exotic plants prior to the island's acquisition by Disney.

Opening
The island opened as Treasure Island on April 8, 1974, as a place to observe wildlife, and was later renamed Discovery Island when it was recognized as a zoological park. 
The admission cost in 1995 was $10.60 for adults and $5.83 for children aged three through nine. In March 1999, admission was $12.67 for adults and $6.89 for children, including tax. The island's facilities were the home of the last known dusky seaside sparrow before it died in July 1987. In 1989, Disney was accused by People for the Ethical Treatment of Animals of mistreating vultures that landed on Discovery Island. Disney confirmed some of them died while being captured by their employees. Following this allegation, State and Federal officials charged Disney with 16 counts of animal cruelty. These charges were ultimately dropped after Disney made improvements, but did not admit to wrongdoings.

Discovery Island housed approximately 150 birds and small primates. It housed the last surviving specimens of the now extinct dusky seaside sparrow.

Filming location

The island was occasionally used as a movie filming location, most notably for the climax of Treasure of Matecumbe (1976), in which it doubled for the titular Florida Key.

Closure
Discovery Island closed to the public on April 8, 1999, exactly 25 years after its opening. but continued to operate until July 9, 1999, at which point all of its animals had been relocated to Disney's Animal Kingdom (whose Safari Village hub area was renamed Discovery Island) and other zoos. Although Disney never officially stated its reasons for closing the park, poor attendance and high maintenance costs, combined with the newer and bigger Disney's Animal Kingdom being opened a year before, are the most likely causes.

Since its closing, the island has sat largely abandoned, with no signs of development. Disney considered teaming up with Cyan Worlds to turn the island into a replica of the titular island from the video game Myst, where visitors would solve puzzles while exploring. As of 2022, all original buildings and attractions remain on the island, though several have sustained major damage from hurricanes and natural decay.

Today, the island can easily be seen from Walt Disney World Monorail, Disney's Wilderness Lodge, Disney's Contemporary Resort and Disney's Fort Wilderness Resort & Campground, as well as from boat trips between them. It is adjacent to the former site of Disney's River Country water park, which closed in November 2001 and was ultimately demolished in April 2019.

Unsanctioned visits
In 2009, an account was published of an unauthorized exploration "a couple of years ago" with photographs by Shane Perez. In 2017 a film was published by Matt Sonswa of exploration of the island.
On April 30, 2020, a man was arrested for camping on Discovery Island. He was removed from the island and banned from Walt Disney property. He called the island a "tropical paradise", and said he did not know the area was off limits to the public.

Former attractions

 Parrots Perch – The Discovery Island Bird Show, featuring Macaws, Cockatoos, and other trained birds.
 Monkey Colony – Capuchin monkeys
 Trumpeter Springs – Trumpeter swans
 Bamboo Hollow – Lemurs from Madagascar.
 Vulture's Haunt – Vultures
 Toucan Corner – Toucans
 Cranes's Roost – Demoiselle cranes, Sandhill cranes, and Grey Crowned cranes
 Avian Way – The United States' most extensive breeding colony of scarlet ibis. Muntjacs and peacocks were also kept here.
 Pelican Bay – Brown pelicans
 Flamingo Lagoon – Flamingos
 Tortoise Beach – five Galápagos tortoises
 Alligator Pool – American alligators
 Eagle's Watch – Bald eagles

References

External links
 Discovery Island on Modern Day Ruins
 BBC report

Defunct amusement parks in Florida
Walt Disney World
Walt Disney Parks and Resorts
1974 establishments in Florida
Former zoos
Lake islands of Florida
Islands of Orange County, Florida
1999 disestablishments in Florida
Islands of Florida
Amusement parks opened in 1974
Amusement parks closed in 1999
Modern ruins